Michael Kedman (born 16 December 1996) is a professional footballer who plays as a defender for Þróttur Vogum. Born in England, he represents the Trinidad and Tobago national team at international level.

Club career
As a youngster, Kedman played for Chelsea, West Ham United and Sheffield United before joining Maldon & Tiptree in the summer of 2016. Later that year, he was playing for Spartan South Midlands Football League side Edgware Town. Kedman then had spells playing in Belgium, Trinidad & Tobago and Spain. In October 2019, he joined Gamma Ethniki side Zakynthos. In August 2020, he joined Icelandic side Fylkir. The following year, he returned to England to join National League South side Dartford, making his debut in September 2021 in an FA Cup. In April 2022, he returned to Iceland to join newly promoted side Þróttur Vogum.

International career
On 4 June 2022, Kedman made his senior international debut for Trinidad and Tobago as a substitute in a 2–1 defeat to Nicaragua in a CONCACAF Nations League match.

References

External links

Profile at Aylesbury United

1996 births
Living people
Trinidad and Tobago footballers
Association football defenders
English footballers
English people of Trinidad and Tobago descent
English expatriate footballers
K. Patro Eisden Maasmechelen players
Central F.C. players
Fylkir players
Dartford F.C. players
Belgian National Division 1 players
Tercera División players
Úrvalsdeild karla (football) players
1. deild karla players
National League (English football) players
Expatriate footballers in Belgium
Expatriate footballers in Spain
Expatriate footballers in Iceland
Þróttur Vogum players
Maldon & Tiptree F.C. players
Edgware Town F.C. players
Footballers from Greater London
A.P.S. Zakynthos players
Gamma Ethniki players
Expatriate footballers in Greece
English expatriate sportspeople in Greece
Black British sportspeople